The following is a list of Michigan State Historic Sites in Kalamazoo County, Michigan. Sites marked with a dagger (†) are also listed on the National Register of Historic Places in Kalamazoo County, Michigan.


Current listings

See also
 National Register of Historic Places listings in Kalamazoo County, Michigan

Sources
 Historic Sites Online – Kalamazoo County. Michigan State Housing Developmental Authority. Accessed March 6, 2011.

References

Kalamazoo County
State Historic Sites
Tourist attractions in Kalamazoo County, Michigan